Impregnated With Wonder is the debut album by comedian Pete Holmes released digitally on November 8, 2011, by Comedy Central Records.

Track listing

Reception 

Impregnated With Wonder was met with positive reviews upon its release. The A.V. Club named it the 5th-best album of 2011, saying: "Impregnated With Wonder has plenty of gratuitously silly moments, each highlighting Holmes' over-the-top sense of humor." LaughSpin said, "This album may very well be one of the most quotable comedy albums of 2011. The end result is the portrait of a comedian embracing a component of comedy that may seem obvious in having fun." The Laugh Button reviewed the album by stating: "From the moment Impregnated With Wonder begins and without even having a visual, you can tell Holmes is all smiles, with his cherub-like “fat Val Kilmer” looks. It's a must-own record for anyone serious about comedy."

References 

2011 debut albums
Comedy Central Records live albums
Stand-up comedy albums
2010s comedy albums
2010s spoken word albums
Spoken word albums by American artists
2011 live albums
Pete Holmes albums